The 2009 Texas Longhorns baseball team represented the University of Texas at Austin in the 2009 NCAA Division I baseball season. The Longhorns played their home games at UFCU Disch–Falk Field. Texas finished the regular season as the #1 team in the Big 12 Conference and the #5 team nationally. The Longhorns won the 2009 Big 12 Conference baseball tournament to earn an automatic bid to the 2009 NCAA Division I baseball tournament, defeating the Missouri Tigers 12–7 in the final. Texas was selected as the #1 seed in the Austin super regional, and as the #1 National Seed overall. Texas went 5–1 in the Regionals, with their one loss coming to TCU in the super regional. They defeated the Horned Frogs in the regional final to advance to the College World Series, marking their 32nd appearance all-time, and first since 2005.

The Longhorns defeated Southern Miss and Arizona State, beating the Sun Devils twice, to advance to the finals of the College World Series, where they faced the LSU Tigers. The Tigers were 8–0 at that point in the tournament, going 5–0 in the Baton Rouge super regional, and defeating Virginia and Arkansas (twice) to advance to the final. The Tigers became National Champions after defeating the Longhorns 11–4 in a decisive Game 3.

Previous season 

In 2008, Texas finished the season ranked at #25 nationally with a record of 37–24, going 15–12 in Big 12 play to claim sole possession of fifth place in the Big 12 Conference. The Longhorns were invited to the 2008 NCAA Division I baseball tournament as an at-large bid, and were placed in the Houston super regional as the #2 seed in the Houston Regional. Texas defeated Sam Houston State and St. John's in the first two rounds, but were ousted by super regional host Rice in the Regional Final.

Roster

Schedule 

! style="background:#bf5700;color:white;"| Regular Season
|- valign="top" 

|- align="center" bgcolor="#bbffbb"
| 1 || February 20 || UIC || UFCU Disch-Falk Field || 6–1 || Ruffin (1–0) || Kovacevich (0–1) || || 5,333 || 1–0 || 0–0
|- align="center" bgcolor="#bbffbb"
| 2 || February 21 || UIC || UFCU Disch-Falk Field || 3–1 || Wood (1–0) || Kool (0–1) || || 5,552 || 2–0 || 0–0
|- align="center" bgcolor="#bbffbb"
| 3 || February 21 || UIC || UFCU Disch-Falk Field || 10–1 (7) || Jungmann (1–0) || Riegler (0–1) || || 5,414 || 3–0 || 0–0
|- align="center" bgcolor="#bbffbb"
| 4 || February 22 || UIC || UFCU Disch-Falk Field || 1–0 || Workman (1–0) || Worthington (0–1) || Wood (1) || 5,282 || 4–0 || 0–0
|- align="center" bgcolor="#bbffbb"
| 5 || February 24 || Texas–Arlington || UFCU Disch-Falk Field || 4–3 || Wood (2–0) || Mitchell (1–1) || || 4,857 || 5–0 || 0–0
|- align="center" bgcolor="#bbffbb"
| 6 || February 27 || Penn State || UFCU Disch-Falk Field || 9–2 || Ruffin (2–0) || Lorentson (0–2) || || 5,469 || 6–0 || 0–0
|- align="center" bgcolor="#bbffbb"
| 7 || February 28 || Penn State || UFCU Disch-Falk Field || 6–2 || Jungmann (2–0) || Kelley (1–1) || Wood (2) || 6,421 || 7–0 || 0–0
|- align="center" bgcolor="#bbffbb"
| 8 || February 28 || Penn State || UFCU Disch-Falk Field || 1–0 || Green (1–0) || Macy (0–1) || Wood (3) || 6,553 || 8–0 || 0–0
|-

|- align="center" bgcolor="#bbffbb"
| 9 || March 1 || Penn State || UFCU Disch-Falk Field || 9–0 || Workman (2–0) || Grumley (0–1) || || 5,491 || 9–0 || 0–0
|- align="center" bgcolor="#bbffbb"
| 10 || March 3 || @ Texas State || Bobcat Ballpark || 6–5 || Wood (3–0) || Brundridge (0–1) || || 2,593 || 10–0 || 0–0
|- align="center" bgcolor="#bbffbb"
| 11 || March 6 || @ Stanford || Sunken Diamond || 6–5 || Ruffin (3–0) || Inman  (0-–) || || 1,835 || 11–0 || 0–0
|- align="center" bgcolor="#ffbbbb"
| 12 || March 7 || @ Stanford || Sunken Diamond || 1–7 || Pries (2–0) || Workman (2–1) || || 2,264 || 11–1 || 0–0
|- align="center" bgcolor="#bbffbb"
| 13 || March 8 || @ Stanford || Sunken Diamond || 5–1 || Green (2–0) || Snodgress (0–1) || || 2,252 || 12–1 || 0–0
|- align="center" bgcolor="#ffbbbb"
| 14 || March 14 || Missouri || UFCU Disch-Falk Field || 0–2 || Gibson (3–1) || Ruffin (3–1) || || 6,547 || 12–2 || 0–1
|- align="center" bgcolor="#bbffbb"
| 15 || March 14 || Missouri || UFCU Disch-Falk Field || 5–0 || Workman (3–1) || Berger (1–2) || || 6,032 || 13–2 || 1–1
|- align="center" bgcolor="#bbffbb"
| 16 || March 15 || Missouri || UFCU Disch-Falk Field || 4–3 || Jungmann (3–0) || Hicks (0–1) || || 6,987 || 14–2 || 2–1
|- align="center" bgcolor="#ffbbbb"
| 17 || March 17 || @ Rice || Reckling Park || 3–6 || Rogers (4–1) || Dicharry (0–1) || Ojala (1) || 6,193 || 14–3 || 2–1
|- align="center" bgcolor="#ffbbbb"
| 18 || March 20 || @ Kansas || Hoglund Ballpark || 4–5 || Hall (2–1) || Ruffin (3–2) || Smyth (4) || 1,041 || 14–4 || 2–2
|- align="center" bgcolor="#ffbbbb"
| 19 || March 21 || @ Kansas || Hoglund Ballpark || 3–4 || Blankenship (2–0) || Jungmann (3–1) || Smyth (5) || 926 || 14–5 || 2–3
|- align="center" bgcolor="#ffbbbb"
| 20 || March 22 || @ Kansas || Hoglund Ballpark || 3–4 || Blankenship (3–0) || Jungmann (3–2) || Smyth (6) || 871 || 14–6 || 2–4
|- align="center" bgcolor="#bbffbb"
| 21 || March 24 || Dallas Baptist || UFCU Disch-Falk Field || 3–0 || Dicharry (1–1) || Black (3–1) || Ruffin (1) || 4,902 || 15–6 || 2–4
|- align="center" bgcolor="#bbffbb"
| 22 || March 27 || Texas Tech || UFCU Disch-Falk Field || 9–5 || Ruffin (4–2) || Morgan (1–4) || Wood (4) || 6,220 || 16–6 || 3–4
|- align="center" bgcolor="#ffbbbb"
| 23 || March 28 || Texas Tech || UFCU Disch-Falk Field || 2–4 || Ramos (3–1) || Workman (3–2) || Bettis (3) || 6,741 || 16–7 || 3–5
|- align="center" bgcolor="#bbffbb"
| 24 || March 29 || Texas Tech || UFCU Disch-Falk Field || 8–1 || Dicharry (2–1) || Karns (1–3) || || 6,665 || 17–7 || 4–5
|- align="center" bgcolor="#bbffbb"
| 25 || March 31 || Oral Roberts || UFCU Disch-Falk Field || 5–4 || Wood (4–0) || Dunn (1–3) || || 4,860 || 18–7 || 4–5
|-

|- align="center" bgcolor="#bbffbb"
| 26 || April 3 || @ #17 Oklahoma State || Allie P. Reynolds Stadium || 7–2 || Ruffin (5–2) || Oliver (4–3) || Wood (5) || 2,114 || 19–7 || 5–5
|- align="center" bgcolor="#ffbbbb"
| 27 || April 4 || @ #17 Oklahoma State || Allie P. Reynolds Stadium || 1–7 || Blandford (6–0) || Workman (3–3) || || 2,612 || 19–8 || 5–6
|- align="center" bgcolor="#bbffbb"
| 28 || April 5 || @ #17 Oklahoma State || Allie P. Reynolds Stadium || 8–5 || Wood (5–0) || Lyons (4–3) || || 482 || 20–8 || 6–6
|- align="center" bgcolor="#bbffbb"
| 29 || April 7 || #19 TCU || UFCU Disch-Falk Field || 6–0 || Dicharry (3–1) || Holle (3–1) || || 5,929 || 21–8 || 6–6
|- align="center" bgcolor="#bbbbbb"
| – || April 9 || @ Nebraska || colspan=8 | Postponed Rescheduled for April 10
|- align="center" bgcolor="#bbffbb"
| 30 || April 10 || @ Nebraska || Haymarket Park || 7–5 || Shinaberry (1–0) || Yost (1–3) || Wood (7) || 5,285 || 22–8 || 7–6
|- align="center" bgcolor="#bbffbb"
| 31 || April 10 || @ Nebraska || Haymarket Park || 11–7 || Carrillo (1–0) || Roualdes (0–1) || || 5,297 || 23–8 || 8–6
|- align="center" bgcolor="#bbffbb"
| 32 || April 11 || @ Nebraska || Haymarket Park || 9–2 || Green (3–0) || Hauptman (2–3) || || 5,219 || 24–8 || 9–6
|- align="center" bgcolor="#bbffbb"
| 33 || April 14 || Texas A&M–Corpus Christi || UFCU Disch-Falk Field || 5–2 || Dicharry (4–1) || Grota (2–2) || Wood (8) || 5,311 || 25–8 || 9–6
|- align="center" bgcolor="#bbffbb"
| 34 || April 15 || Texas A&M–Corpus Christi || UFCU Disch-Falk Field || 8–1 || Thomas (1–0) || Carnline (3–4) || || 4,893 || 26–8 || 9–6
|- align="center" bgcolor="#bbbbbb"
| – || April 17 || #10 Oklahoma || colspan=8 | Postponed Rescheduled for April 18
|- align="center" bgcolor="#bbffbb"
| 35 || April 18 || #10 Oklahoma || UFCU Disch-Falk Field || 7–3 || Ruffin (6–2) || Doyle (5–3) || Wood (9) || 7,412 || 27–8 || 10–6
|- align="center" bgcolor="#bbffbb"
| 36 || April 18 || #10 Oklahoma || UFCU Disch-Falk Field || 6–2 || Dicharry (5–1) || Porlier (1–1) || || 7,531 || 28–8 || 11–6
|- align="center" bgcolor="#bbffbb"
| 37 || April 19 || #10 Oklahoma || UFCU Disch-Falk Field || 8–5 (8) || Jungmann (4–2) || Anderson (0–1) || Wood (10) || 7,313 || 29–8 || 12–6
|- align="center" bgcolor="#ffbbbb"
| 38 || April 21 || #2 Rice || UFCU Disch-Falk Field || 2–7 || Wright (3–0) || Green (3–1) || Wall (1) || 7,366 || 29–9 || 12–6
|- align="center" bgcolor="#ffbbbb"
| 39 || April 24 || #23 Kansas State || UFCU Disch-Falk Field || 2–4 || Morris (10–0) || Wood (4–1) || || 5,473 || 29–10 || 12–7
|- align="center" bgcolor="#ffbbbb" 
| 40 || April 25 || #23 Kansas State || UFCU Disch-Falk Field || 4–5 (12) || Applegate (2–1) || Jungmann (4–3) || || 6,344 || 29–11 || 12–8
|- align="center" bgcolor="#ffffbb"
| 41 || April 26 || #23 Kansas State || UFCU Disch-Falk Field || 6–6 (10) || || || || 5,552 || 29–11–1 || 12–8–1
|- align="center" bgcolor="#bbffbb"
| 42 || April 28 || Texas State || UFCU Disch-Falk Field || 12–2 || Thomas (2–0) || Carruth (3–2) || || 5,495 || 30–11–1 || 12–8–1
|-

|- align="center" bgcolor="#bbffbb"
| 43 || May 1 || #17 Baylor || UFCU Disch-Falk Field || 12–4 || Ruffin (7–2) || Volz (3–5) || Wood (11) || 6,852 || 31–11–1 || 13–8–1 
|- align="center" bgcolor="#bbffbb"
| 44 || May 2 || #17 Baylor || UFCU Disch-Falk Field || 19–11 || Green (4–1) || Miller (3–3) || || 4,812 || 32–11–1 || 14–8–1
|- align="center" bgcolor="#bbffbb"
| 45 || May 3 || #17 Baylor || UFCU Disch-Falk Field || 3–1 || Jungmann (5–3) || Kempf (4–3) || Wood (12) || 3,858 || 33–11–1 || 15–8–1
|- align="center" bgcolor="#bbffbb"
| 46 || May 6 || Texas Southern || UFCU Disch-Falk Field || 7–3 || Thomas (3–0) || Carcamo (2–3) || || 5,085 || 34–11–1 || 15–8–1
|- align="center" bgcolor="#bbffbb"
| 47 || May 8 || @ #14 Texas A&M || Olsen Field || 11–9 (10) || Wood (5–1) || Wilson (5–6) || Dicharry (1) || 8,343 || 35–11–1 || 16–8–1
|- align="center" bgcolor="#ffbbbb"
| 48 || May 9 || #14 Texas A&M || UFCU Disch-Falk Field || 0–3 || Hales (5–1) || Green (4–2) || || 7,384 || 35–12–1 || 16–9–1
|- align="center" bgcolor="#bbffbb"
| 49 || May 10 || #14 Texas A&M || UFCU Disch-Falk Field || 5–4 || Dicharry (4–1) || Loux (3–2) || Wood (13) || 7,613 || 36–12–1 || 17–9–1
|- align="center" bgcolor="#bbffbb"
| 50 || May 17 || Alabama A&M || UFCU Disch-Falk Field || 5–1 || Ruffin (8–2) || Hernandez (4–6) || || 5,157 || 37–12–1 || 17–9–1
|- align="center" bgcolor="#bbffbb"
| 51 || May 17 || Alabama A&M || UFCU Disch-Falk Field || 9–3 || Jungmann (6–3) || Toone (0–3) || || 5,916 || 38–12–1 || 17–9–1
|-

|-
! style="background:#bf5700;color:white;"| Post-Season
|-

|- align="center" bgcolor="#ffbbbb"
| 52 || May 20 || Baylor || Bricktown Ballpark || 9–14 || Fritsch (3–5) || Dicharry (6–2) || Volz (1) || 4,351 || 38–13–1 || 0–1
|- align="center" bgcolor="#bbffbb"
| 53 || May 21 || Kansas || Bricktown Ballpark || 9–3 || Ruffin (9–2) || Walz (8–2) || || 4,396 || 39–13–1 || 1–1
|- align="center" bgcolor="#bbffbb"
| 54 || May 23 || Kansas State || Bricktown Ballpark || 4–2 || Jungmann (7–3) || Applegate (2–2) || Wood (14) || 5,720 || 40–13–1 || 2–1
|- align="center" bgcolor="#bbffbb"
| 55 || May 24 || Missouri || Bricktown Ballpark || 12–7 || Dicharry (7–2) || Hicks (5–3) || || 5,316 || 41–13–1 || 3–1
|-

|- align="center" bgcolor="#bbffbb"
| 56 || May 29 || Army || UFCU Disch-Falk Field || 3–1 || Green (5–2) || Fouch (7–4) || Wood (15) || 6,832 || 42–13–1 || 1–0
|- align="center" bgcolor="#bbffbb"
| 57 || May 30 || Boston College || UFCU Disch-Falk Field || 3–2 (25) || Dicharry (8–2) || Dennhardt (5–2) || || 7,104 || 43–13–1 || 2–0
|- align="center" bgcolor="#bbffbb"
| 58 || May 31 || Army || UFCU Disch-Falk Field || 14–10 || Thomas (4–0) || Fouch (7–5) || || 7,034 || 44–13–1 || 3–0
|-

|- align="center" bgcolor="#bbffbb"
| 59 || June 6 || TCU || UFCU Disch-Falk Field || 10–4 || Ruffin (10–2) || Winkler (7–1) || || 7,220 || 45–13–1 || 4–0
|- align="center" bgcolor="#ffbbbb"
| 60 || June 7 || TCU || UFCU Disch-Falk Field || 2–3 || Gerrish (6–2) || Green (5–3) || Marshall (9) || 7,205 || 45–14–1 || 4–1
|- align="center" bgcolor="#bbffbb"
| 61 || June 8 || TCU || UFCU Disch-Falk Field || 5–2 || Jungmann (8–3) || Lockwood (4–2) || Ruffin (2) || 7,241 || 46–14–1 || 5–1
|-

|- align="center" bgcolor="#bbffbb"
| 62 || June 14 || Southern Miss || Rosenblatt Stadium || 7–6 || Jungmann (9–3) || Fields (2–1) || || 24,142 || 47–14–1 || 6–1
|- align="center" bgcolor="#bbffbb"
| 63 || June 16 || Arizona State || Rosenblatt Stadium || 10–6 || Jungmann (10–3) || Lambson (9–4) || || 24,152 || 48–14–1 || 7–1
|- align="center" bgcolor="#bbffbb"
| 64 || June 19 || Arizona State || Rosenblatt Stadium || 4–3 || Wood (6–1) || Lambson (9–5) || || 23,257 || 49–14–1 || 8–1
|- align="center" bgcolor="#ffbbbb"
| 65 || June 22 || LSU || Rosenblatt Stadium || 6–7 (11) || Ott (4–2) || Workman (3–4) || || 23,019 || 49–15–1 || 8–2
|- align="center" bgcolor="#bbffbb"
| 66 || June 23 || LSU || Rosenblatt Stadium || 5–1 || Jungmann (11–3) || Ross (6–8) || || 21,871 || 50–15–1 || 9–2
|- align="center" bgcolor="#ffbbbb"
| 67 || June 24 || LSU || Rosenblatt Stadium || 4–11 || Ranaudo (12–3) || Workman (3–5) || || 19,986 || 50–16–1 || 9–3
|-

2009 Texas Longhorns Baseball Schedule http://www.texassports.com/sports/m-basebl/archive/tex-m-basebl-sched-2008.html

Postseason

Big 12 tournament

NCAA tournament

College World Series

Rankings 

^ Collegiate Baseball ranked 35 teams in their preseason poll, but only ranked 30 teams weekly during the season.

* Only the final Coaches' poll from the 2009 season is currently available.

Notes 

 Texas' 3–2 win in the regionals against Boston College went 25 innings, marking the longest game in NCAA Baseball history.
 Freshman pitcher Taylor Jungmann, outfielder/designated hitter Russell Moldenhauer, and catcher Cameron Rupp were named to the College World Series All-Tournament Team.

Statistics 

Below are the player statistics for the 2009 Texas Longhorns baseball team.

Batting 

Note: G = Games played; AB = At bats; R = Runs; H = Hits; 2B = Doubles; 3B = Triples; HR = Home runs; RBI = Runs batted in; AVG = Batting average; OBP = On-base percentage; SLG = Slugging percentage; BB = walks; K = Strikeouts; HBP = Hit by pitches

Pitching 

Note: W–L = Wins–losses; ERA = Earned run average; G = Games played; GS = Games started; CG = Complete games; SV = Saves; IP = Innings pitched; H = Hits allowed; R = Runs allowed; ER = Earned runs allowed; BB = Walks allowed; SO = Strikeouts; HR = Home runs allowed; BAA = Batting average against

Fielding 

Note: PO = Putouts; A = Assists; E = Errors; FLD% = Fielding percentage; DPs = Double plays; SBA = Stolen bases attempted; CS = Caught stealing; CS% = Caught stealing percentage; PB = Passed balls; CI = Catcher's interference

MLB Draft 

The following members of the 2009 Texas Longhorns baseball team were eventually selected in the Major League Baseball Draft.

References 

Texas Longhorns baseball seasons
College World Series seasons
Texas Longhorns
Big 12 Conference baseball champion seasons
Texas